Buenos Aires International Christian Academy, abbreviated "BAICA", is a pre-K through Grade 12 International school in San Fernando, Buenos Aires Province, in Greater Buenos Aires. BAICA is a member of the Association of Christian Schools International (ACSI), and the Southern Association of Colleges and Schools (SACS).

There are more than 20 nationalities represented within the student body whose families represent the diplomatic, missionary, international business and local communities.  BAICA provides a Christian education and offers small class sizes. It is open to children of any faith.

The curriculum is based on an international system of education. In addition to the core subjects of Math, English, Social Studies and Science, courses in Spanish, Bible, Fine Arts, Computer Studies and Physical Education are part of the curriculum.  BAICA also offers Advanced Placement (AP) classes, and Honors classes.  Most of the classes are taught in English by certified American teachers.  Students also take part in extracurricular activities such as violin, guitar, singing, drama, musicals, journalism, outreach teams and service clubs.

Students of BAICA graduate with dual degrees: U.S. and Argentine.  The academic goal of BAICA is that graduates will be prepared to enter U.S. or other western Universities and Colleges.

The daily schedule is from 8:30 am to 4:00 pm and the school year is divided in two semesters: August to December and February to June. It is unusual in comparison with Argentine schools because BAICA's school year starts in August, in keeping with a more US or international based calendar, whereas the Argentine school year begins in February.

History
In the spring of 1997, the concept of developing an international Christian school in Buenos Aires grew out of the desires of local expatriate parents who were concerned about the content of their children's education. A group of parents began to pursue starting an international Christian school through NICS, which also shared the vision of opening a school in Buenos Aires. In February 1998 Buenos Aires International Christian Academy opened its doors with 17 students.

The student body of BAICA is predominantly composed of children who have spent a period of their lives in cultures other than their passport country. These children are missionaries' kids, children of embassy staff, children of military personnel or children of international business people.

The Office of Overseas Schools at the U.S. State Department approved the school for U.S. Embassy families.

As the number of students grew, BAICA opened its doors to the local community. The Argentine government mandated that BAICA become officially accredited. The Board of Directors decided to continue BAICA as an official Argentine school while continuing with its primary mission. BAICA continues to serve the international English speaking community and those Argentines who may wish to study in the States or abroad. Besides allowing BAICA to continue, the Argentine accreditation permits BAICA to open its doors to more embassies and international businesses.

BAICA became a member of the Association of Christian Schools International (ACSI) and the Southern Baptist Association of Christian Schools (SBACS), and grew to its current enrollment, which at the end of the 2009-10 school year was over 150 students.

References

External links

 Official website
 ACSI website
 A description of BAICA at missionteach.com
 A short description of BAICA from isvillage.com

Biography
"Schools Abroad of Interest to Americans" by PorterSargent books

International schools in Greater Buenos Aires
Private schools in Argentina
Secondary schools in Argentina
Christian schools in Argentina